Ioan Popovici (23 August 1865 – 1953, in Sighet) was a Romanian general assigned to the general staff headquarters, during World War I. He attended the  (Military Infantry and Cavalry School) in Bucharest from 1885 to 1887. Afterward he rose through the ranks until he became a brigadier general in 1916 as World War I was raging, engulfing Romania. He was known as "Epure" to distinguish him from another Romanian general with the same name.

In World War I, he was assigned to the general staff at headquarters.

After the Communists took power in Romania, he was arrested in 1948 (at 83 years of age), ultimately dying in Sighet Prison in 1953.

References

Bibliography
 Falkenhayn, Erich von, Campania Armatei a 9-a împotriva românilor și a rușilor, Atelierele Grafice Socec & Co S.A., București, 1937
 Kirițescu, Constantin, Istoria războiului pentru întregirea României, Editura Științifică și Enciclopedică, București, 1989
 
 România în războiul mondial 1916-1919, Documente, Anexe, Volumul 1, Monitorul Oficial și Imprimeriile Statului, București, 1934
 Marele Cartier General al Armatei României. Documente 1916 – 1920, Editura Machiavelli, București, 1996
 Istoria militară a poporului român, vol. V, Editura Militară, București, 1989
 România în anii primului Război Mondial, Editura Militară, București, 1987
 România în primul război mondial, Editura Militară, 1979

1865 births
1953 deaths
Place of birth missing
Date of death missing
Romanian Land Forces generals
Romanian Army World War I generals
Romanian military personnel of World War I
Romanian Ministers of Agriculture
Prisoners and detainees of Romania
Inmates of Sighet prison
Prisoners who died in Romanian detention
Romanian people who died in prison custody